Twisted Rails is a 1934 American Western film directed by Albert Herman. It was distributed by the independent Imperial Distributing Corporation for the states-rights market.  The plot concerns $50,000 in gold that is hidden on a train and a gang's efforts to get it.

Cast 
Jack Donovan as Jim Conway
Alice Dahl as Mary McGuire
Philo McCullough as Black Jack Bolivar
Donald Keith as Louie Weinstock
Victor Potel as Tom Watson
Robert 'Buddy' Shaw as Tommy McGuire
Donald Mack as Dude Malloy
Henry Roquemore as Gilbert Henderson
Pat Harmon as Barney McGuire
Tom London as Sheriff James
Adabelle Driver as Mrs. McGuire
Lawrence Underwood as Master mechanic

External links 

1934 films
American black-and-white films
1934 Western (genre) films
Films directed by Albert Herman
American Western (genre) films
1930s English-language films
1930s American films